Nevisdale is an unincorporated community and coal town located in Whitley County, Kentucky, United States.

The Nevisdale Elementary School closed in 2008. Whitley County decided to consolidate Poplar Creek Elementary School and Nevisdale Elementary School into a new school, Whitley East Elementary School.

References

Unincorporated communities in Whitley County, Kentucky
Unincorporated communities in Kentucky
Coal towns in Kentucky